James R. "Rick" Just is an American politician and author serving as a member of the Idaho Senate for the 15th district. Elected in November 2022, he assumed office on December 1, 2022.

Early life and education 
Just was born in Blackfoot, Idaho, and graduated from Firth High School. He earned a Bachelor of Arts degree in English and a Master of Public Administration from Boise State University.

Career 
Just served in the United States Marine Corps from 1969 to 1971. For 30 years, he worked for the Idaho Department of Parks and Recreation, retiring as chief planner. Just is also the author of two adult novels, four YA novels, and several books on Idaho history. He was elected to the Idaho Senate in November 2022.

References 

Living people
Idaho Democrats
Idaho state senators
People from Blackfoot, Idaho
Boise State University alumni
Year of birth missing (living people)